Sexy Sam is a single and an EP by American post-hardcore band Girls Against Boys, released on May 16, 1994 by Touch and Go Records. The vinyl version was released as a single, with "Sexy Sam" on one side and "I'm From France" on the other side. The CD version, however, was released as a mini-compilation. It consisted of six tracks, the two aforementioned new recordings plus previously released songs, one from each era of the band: "Stay in the Car" from Nineties vs. Eighties, "My Night of Pleasure" from Tropic of Scorpio, "Rockets Are Red" from Venus Luxure No. 1 Baby, and "Sharkmeat" (also from the Venus Luxure No. 1 Baby era, used as a b-side to "Bulletproof Cupid").

Track listing

Personnel 
Adapted from the Sexy Sam liner notes.

 Girls Against Boys
 Alexis Fleisig – drums
 Eli Janney – sampler, bass guitar, backing vocals
 Scott McCloud – lead vocals, guitar
 Johnny Temple – bass guitar

Production and additional personnel
 John Loder – engineering
 Ted Niceley – production

Release history

References

External links 
 

1994 EPs
Girls Against Boys albums
Touch and Go Records EPs
Albums produced by Ted Niceley